Nature of America is a series of twelve self-adhesive stamp sheets that the United States Postal Service released annually between 1999 and 2010 starting with the Sonoran Desert sheet and ending with the Hawaiian Rain Forest Sheet. Like the Celebrate the Century stamp series, these were printed on large sheets 9"x8¾" (233mm x 171mm), but differed from the former in that they were self adhesive and not gummed.

Design process
The sheets were designed by Ethel Kessler and illustrated by artist John D. Dawson for the USPS. The original idea for the series, conceived 1996, was for a set of four American desert stamps.  This was inspired by the success of Desert Plants commemorative stamps released in 1981. Artist John D. Dawson was recommended by art director Howard Paine and selected for the illustration of these four stamps. Paine had worked with Dawson on three previous USPS issues: American Cats (1988), Idaho Statehood (1990), and Flowering Trees (1998). From four stamps the idea expanded into a proposed  set of six stamp sheets covering six ecosystems. After the commercial success of the first sheets the USPS decided to extend the series by six more ecosystems from the Sonoran Desert to the Hawaiian Rain Forest.

The design team drew inspiration from The World of Dinosaurs two-sheet issue of 1997. These sheets were panoramic in design with punched perforations on a gummed sheet. Since the punched perforations would distract the visual continuity of the design, the team decided to go for the self-adhesive format with serpentine die cutting for the individual stamps. Each sheet consisted of a large panoramic image of a U.S. geographical region, with the region's flora and fauna clearly visible. Ten stamps were die cut on to the design, each composing one or more species indigenous to the depicted region. The rear of sheet had a brief descriptive text of the stamp images, accompanied with a graphic outline of the stamp images. The flora and fauna depicted were identified and labelled.

The sheets
Starting with the Sonoran Desert sheet, the USPS issued a total of twelve sheets in the series. The sheets issued along with date and place of issue denomination and printer:

References and sources 
References

Sources
 USPS News Releases
 Nature of America - US stamp sheets

Postage stamps of the United States